Rualena is a genus of North American funnel weavers first described by R. V. Chamberlin & Wilton Ivie in 1942.

Species
 it contains fourteen species found in the United States and Mexico:
Rualena alleni Chamberlin & Ivie, 1942 – USA
Rualena avila Chamberlin & Ivie, 1942 – USA
Rualena balboae (Schenkel, 1950) – USA
Rualena cavata (F. O. Pickard-Cambridge, 1902) – Mexico
Rualena cedros Maya-Morales & Jiménez, 2016 – Mexico
Rualena cockerelli Chamberlin & Ivie, 1942 – USA
Rualena cruzana Chamberlin & Ivie, 1942 – USA
Rualena magnacava Chamberlin & Ivie, 1942 – USA, Mexico
Rualena parritas Maya-Morales & Jiménez, 2016 – Mexico
Rualena pasquinii Brignoli, 1974 – Mexico
Rualena rua (Chamberlin, 1919) – USA
Rualena surana Chamberlin & Ivie, 1942 – USA
Rualena thomas Maya-Morales & Jiménez, 2016 – USA
Rualena ubicki Maya-Morales & Jiménez, 2016 – Mexico

References

External links

Agelenidae
Araneomorphae genera
Spiders of Mexico
Spiders of the United States